The national symbols of Bulgaria are the symbols that represent Bulgaria and the Bulgarian people.

Official symbols

Other symbols

See also
List of World Heritage Sites in Bulgaria

References

 
Bulgarian culture